Gloripallium pallium is a species of bivalves belonging to the family Pectinidae.

The species is found in Indian and Pacific Ocean, Australia.

<div align=center>
Right and left valve of the same specimen:

</div align=center>

References

Pectinidae